The French Legion may refer to:

 French Foreign Legion
 Legion of Honour of France
 Legion of French Volunteers Against Bolshevism
 Czechoslovak Legion in France
 French Armenian Legion
 Legion of France, see Boer foreign volunteers

See also
 French Foreign Legion (disambiguation)
 2nd Foreign Legion (France)
 List of military legions
 List of Roman legions
 American Legion (disambiguation)
 British Legion (disambiguation)
 German Legion (disambiguation)
 Legion (disambiguation)